Brooklyn, the most populous of New York City's five boroughs, contains over 60 high-rises that stand taller than . The Brooklyn Tower, a condominium and rental tower in the Downtown neighborhood of the borough, is Brooklyn's tallest building at  following its topping out in October 2021.

History

The construction of high-rise buildings in Brooklyn began during the late 19th century, following the completion of the Brooklyn Bridge in 1883 and the building of elevated railroads and streetcar lines during the late 1880s. Increased accessibility to Downtown Brooklyn brought greater economic growth and propagated denser commercial development, which increased the heights of downtown buildings throughout the 1890s. This led to the 1891 construction of Brooklyn's first skyscraper, the 10-story Franklin Trust Company Building. In the early 20th-century, the opening of multiple New York City Subway lines in Downtown Brooklyn spurred further development of tall commercial buildings. The Zoning Resolution of 1916, which required buildings to incorporate setbacks from the street to allow for sunlight, influenced the construction of taller, more slender buildings.

In 1918, the 22-story and  building at 32 Court Street was completed and regarded as Brooklyn's first "true skyscraper", and thus initiated a skyscraper building boom in Brooklyn centered on Court and Montague Streets. Brooklyn's high-rise development continued unabated into the 1920s. Brooklyn's skyscraper building boom ceased during the Great Depression, and the Williamsburgh Savings Bank Tower in Fort Greene, which was completed in 1929, remained Brooklyn's tallest building until 2009.

In 2004, several portions of Downtown Brooklyn were rezoned to promote more commercial, residential, and retail development. This rezoning allowed for greater density of development, and combined with an increased demand for housing, these areas experienced a boom in the construction of tall buildings. In addition to Downtown Brooklyn, high-rise buildings are also concentrated in the Brooklyn Heights, Fort Greene, and Williamsburg neighborhoods, although other Brooklyn neighborhoods have significant numbers of high-rises. The Brooklyn Tower which rises to a height of 1,066 feet in Downtown Brooklyn, became the tallest building in the NYC area outside of Manhattan, and the tallest building on Long Island.

Tallest buildings
An equal sign (=) following a rank indicates the same height between two or more buildings. An asterisk (*) indicates that the building is still under construction, but has been topped out. The "Year" column indicates the year in which a building was completed.

Tallest buildings under construction or proposed

Under construction
There are a number of buildings under construction in Brooklyn that are expected to rise at least  in height.

Tallest buildings proposed

Tallest buildings cancelled

Timeline of tallest buildings 
This lists buildings that once held the title of tallest building in Brooklyn.

See also
 Architecture of New York City
 List of tallest buildings in New York City
 List of tallest buildings in Queens
 List of tallest buildings on Long Island

References
Explanatory notes
a.  An asterisk (*) indicates that the building is still under construction, but has been topped out.

Citations

Sources

External links
 
 Diagram of New York City skyscrapers on SkyscraperPage

Brooklyn
Brooklyn
Tallest buildings in Brooklyn

Tallest in Brooklyn